Irene Roswitha Heim (born in Munich, Germany, on October 30, 1954) is a linguist and a leading specialist in semantics. She was a professor at the University of Texas at Austin and UCLA before moving to the Massachusetts Institute of Technology in 1989, where she is Professor Emerita of Linguistics. She served as Head of the Linguistics Section of the Department of Linguistics and Philosophy.

Biography
Heim's parents were German-speakers born in then-Czechoslovakia, who had emigrated to Germany after World War II. She attended school in Munich, and studied at the University of Konstanz and the Ludwig Maximilian University of Munich, graduating from the latter in 1978 with an MA in Linguistics and Philosophy and a minor in mathematics. Following this, she studied for a PhD at the University of Massachusetts Amherst, completing her dissertation in 1982.

After short-term postdoctoral positions at Stanford University, MIT, the University of Texas at Austin (1983-1987), and UCLA, she took up a faculty position at MIT in 1987, receiving tenure as an associate professor in 1993 and becoming promoted to full professor in 1997.

Research
Heim's 1982 dissertation The semantics of definite and indefinite noun phrases  is considered a classic text and a major milestone in formal semantics. In the second chapter of the work she argued (developing an insight by the philosopher David Lewis) that indefinite noun phrases like a cat in the sentence If a cat is not in Athens, she is in Rhodes are not quantifiers but free variables bound by an existential operator inserted in the sentence by a semantic operation that she dubbed existential closure. In the third chapter of the work she developed a compositional dynamic theory of (in)definites. This work, along with Hans Kamp's roughly contemporaneous 'A Theory of Truth and Semantic Representation' (1981), became the founding work in the influential tradition of dynamic semantics and the first compositional dynamic fragment.

She is the co-author with Angelika Kratzer of Semantics in Generative Grammar, an influential textbook of formal semantics, and was a founding co-editor (also with Kratzer) of the journal Natural Language Semantics.

Awards

In 2010 Irene Heim was awarded a Senior Fellowship of the Zukunftskolleg at the University of Konstanz.

In 2012 she was inducted as a Fellow of the Linguistic Society of America.

In 2014 Heim was the recipient of a festschrift, The Art and Craft of Semantics.

References

External links 
  Heim's MIT faculty page

Linguists from the United States
Living people
University of Massachusetts Amherst College of Humanities and Fine Arts alumni
University of Texas at Austin faculty
University of California, Los Angeles faculty
MIT School of Humanities, Arts, and Social Sciences faculty
Semanticists
Fellows of the Linguistic Society of America
Women linguists
1954 births